Oldsum (Fering: Olersem) is a municipality on the island of Föhr, in the district of Nordfriesland, in Schleswig-Holstein, Germany.

Geography

The municipality of Oldsum consists of the three hamlets of Oldsum, Klintum (Fering: Klantem) and Toftum (Fering: Taftem) which are spread over some two kilometres along a main road. The population number about 600. The landscape is marked by well-preserved thatched farmhouses. Oldsum's landmark is an ancient thatched windmill whose antecessor presumably dates back to the year 1700. Though burned down 200 years later, it was rebuilt and subsequently was in use until 1954. Since 1972 the mill is exclusively used as a dwelling house. Oldsum is situated approximately two kilometres from the western shore of the island, the northern coastline is a little closer. Oldsum adjoins Süderende to the south, Dunsum to the southwest and Alkersum and Midlum to the east.

History

Oldsum was first recorded in 1462 as Uluersum. During the 17th and 18th centuries, Oldsum, Klintum and Toftum were important whaling villages. A census in 1787 showed that a total of 211 of the inhabitants of the three places were seafarers. One of the most successful whalers, Matthias Petersen (1632–1706) lived in Oldsum proper. In his lifetime he was able to catch 373 whales, his tomb can still be visited in the graveyard of the St. Laurentii church in Süderende.

As a part of Westerland Föhr, Oldsum belonged to the Royal Enclaves of Denmark and thus was a direct part of the Danish crown while Osterland Föhr belonged to the Duchy of Schleswig. Only when Denmark lost Schleswig to Prussia in the Second Schleswig War, Oldsum became a part of Schleswig-Holstein.

Politics
Since the communal elections of 2008, the Oldsumer Wählergemeinschaft holds eight seats out of nine in the municipality's council. The ninth seat is held by an independent contestant.

Economy
With the rise of tourism, agriculture began to decrease in significance. Today there are only a few scattered farmsteads. Some farms were evacuated out of the town in the 1950s and 60's and are now situated outside the village proper but still in the municipality's area. Oldsum underwent a transformation from a farmers' to an artists' village, numerous studios and galleries can now be found there. Other important economical factors are a rising number of crafts enterprises as well as retailing.

Notable people
Hinrich Braren, 19th century nautical examiner who wrote the first nautical textbook in German language
Oluf Braren, 18th century painter
Arfst F. Frudden, 20th century politician
Matthias Petersen, 17th century whaling captain, called "Lucky"
Friede Springer, widow of Axel Springer and major shareholder of Axel Springer AG

References

External links

Oldsum

Föhr
Nordfriesland